Jamie Murphy may refer to:
 
 Jamie Murphy (footballer, born 1971), English football striker
 Jamie Murphy (footballer, born 1973), English footballer
 Jamie Murphy (footballer, born 1989), Scottish footballer
 Jamie Murphy (rugby) (born 1989), Welsh rugby league player
 Jamie Murphy (Space guitarist) (born 1975), English musician
 Jamie Murphy (curler) (born 1981), Canadian curler

See also 
 James Murphy (disambiguation)